Tazeh Kand (also Romanized as Tāzeh Kand; also known as Tāzeh Kand-e Emām) is a village in Torkaman Rural District, in the Central District of Urmia County, West Azerbaijan Province, Iran. At the 2006 census, its population was 365, in 94 families.

References 

Populated places in Urmia County